In mathematics, a monomial is, roughly speaking, a polynomial which has only one term. Two definitions of a monomial may be encountered:
 A monomial, also called power product, is a product of powers of variables with nonnegative integer exponents, or, in other words, a product of variables, possibly with repetitions. For example,  is a monomial. If several variables are considered, say,  then each can be given an exponent, so that any monomial is of the form  with  non-negative integers (taking note that any exponent  makes the corresponding factor equal to ).
 A monomial is a monomial in the first sense multiplied by a nonzero constant, called the coefficient of the monomial.

In the context of Laurent polynomials and Laurent series, the exponents of a monomial may be negative, and in the context of Puiseux series, the exponents may be rational numbers.

Since the word "monomial", as well as the word "polynomial", comes from the late Latin word "binomium" (binomial), by changing the prefix "bi-" (two in Latin), a monomial should theoretically be called a "mononomial". "Monomial" is a syncope by haplology of "mononomial".

Comparison of the two definitions 
With either definition, the set of monomials is a subset of all polynomials that is closed under multiplication.

Both uses of this notion can be found, and in many cases the distinction is simply ignored, see for instance examples for the first and second meaning. In informal discussions the distinction is seldom important, and tendency is towards the broader second meaning. When studying the structure of polynomials however, one often definitely needs a notion with the first meaning. This is for instance the case when considering a monomial basis of a polynomial ring, or a monomial ordering of that basis. An argument in favor of the first meaning is also that no obvious other notion is available to designate these values (the term power product is in use, in particular when monomial is used with the first meaning, but it does not make the absence of constants clear either), while the notion term of a polynomial unambiguously coincides with the second meaning of monomial. 

The remainder of this article assumes the first meaning of "monomial".

Monomial basis

The most obvious fact about monomials (first meaning) is that any polynomial is a linear combination of them, so they form a basis of the vector space of all polynomials, called the monomial basis - a fact of constant implicit use in mathematics.

Number
The number of monomials of degree  in  variables is the number of multicombinations of  elements chosen among the  variables (a variable can be chosen more than once, but order does not matter), which is given by the multiset coefficient .

The latter forms are particularly useful when one fixes the number of variables and lets the degree vary.

The Hilbert series is a compact way to express the number of monomials of a given degree: the number of monomials of degree  in  variables is the coefficient of degree  of the formal power series expansion of

This follows from the one-to-one correspondence between the monomials of degree  in  variables and the monomials of degree at most  in  variables, which consists in substituting by 1 the extra variable.

Multi-index notation

The multi-index notation is often useful for having a compact notation, specially when there are more than two or three variables. If the variables being used form an indexed family like  one can set 

and

Then the monomial 

can be compactly written as

With this notation, the product of two monomials is simply expressed by using the addition of exponent vectors:

Degree

The degree of a nonzero constant is 0. For example, the degree of −7 is 0. 

The degree of a monomial is sometimes called order, mainly in the context of series. It is also called total degree when it is needed to distinguish it from the degree in one of the variables.

Monomial degree is fundamental to the theory of univariate and multivariate polynomials. Explicitly, it is used to define the degree of a polynomial and the notion of homogeneous polynomial, as well as for graded monomial orderings used in formulating and computing Gröbner bases. Implicitly, it is used in grouping the terms of a Taylor series in several variables.

Geometry

In algebraic geometry the varieties defined by monomial equations  for some set of α have special properties of homogeneity. This can be phrased in the language of algebraic groups, in terms of the existence of a group action of an algebraic torus (equivalently by a multiplicative group of diagonal matrices). This area is studied under the name of torus embeddings.

See also
 Monomial representation
 Monomial matrix
 Homogeneous polynomial
 Homogeneous function
 Multilinear form
 Log-log plot
 Power law
 Sparse polynomial

References

Homogeneous polynomials
Algebra